Valparaíso is a city in the north central Mexican state of Zacatecas.

Geography

History
Valparaíso was first a village and then hacienda along with the San Mateo and a few others formed the extensive county of Valparaíso, property of the counts of the same title one of them Don Fernando de la Campa y Cos, was a very rich man also involved in philanthropy building infrastructure for the Catholic Church. Later in 1824, Valparaiso becomes a municipality. On March 13, 1845 Valparaíso was declared a villa and in 1918 it became an independent municipality in accord with the Mexican constitution.

Economy
Valparaíso is an agricultural center for corn, wheat, chickpeas, alfalfa, chiles and beef, pork, sheep, and goat.

Personalities
Jesús González Ortega (1822-1881), military and politician
Manuel Felguérez (b. 1928) sculptor and painter

Twin towns
 Hanover Park (Illinois, USA), 2013

References

External links

Populated places in Zacatecas
Populated places established in 1568